{{Infobox football club season
|club               = Cardiff City FC
|season             = 2022–23
|owner              = Vincent Tan
|chairman           = Mehmet Dalman
|manager            = Steve Morison(until 18 September)Mark Hudson(from 14 November until 14 January)Sabri Lamouchi(from 27 January)
|stadium            = Cardiff City Stadium
|league             = Championship
|league result      = 21st|cup1               = FA Cup
|cup1 result        = Third round
|cup2               = EFL Cup
|cup2 result        = First round
|league topscorer   = Callum Robinson (5)
|season topscorer   = Callum Robinson (7)
|highest attendance = 22,156 vs. Bristol City, 4 March 2023
|lowest attendance  = 6,303 vs. Portsmouth, 9 August 2022
|average attendance = 18,368 
|largest win        = 3–1 vs. Wigan Athletic (8 October 2022)
|largest loss       = 0–3 vs. Portsmouth (9 August 2022)
|pattern_la1        = 
|pattern_b1         = _cardiff2223h
|pattern_ra1        = 
|pattern_sh1        = 
|pattern_so1        = 
|leftarm1           = 0237D7
|body1              = 0237D7
|rightarm1          = 0237D7
|shorts1            = 0237D7
|socks1             = 0237D7
| pattern_la2       = 
| pattern_b2        = _cardiff2223a
| pattern_ra2       = 
| pattern_sh2       = 
| pattern_so2       = 
| leftarm2          = 858d97
| body2             = 858d97
| rightarm2         = 858d97
| shorts2           = 0d0e0f
| socks2            = 858d97
|pattern_la3        = 
|pattern_b3         = _cardiff2223t
|pattern_ra3        = 
|pattern_sh3        = 
|pattern_so3        = 
|leftarm3           = e4d4df
|body3              = 
|rightarm3          = e4d4df
|shorts3            = e4d4df
|socks3             = e4d4df
|prevseason         = 2021–22
|nextseason         = 2023–24}}
The 2022–23 season will be the 124th season in the existence of Cardiff City Football Club and the club's fourth consecutive season in the Championship. In addition to the league, they will also compete in the 2022–23 FA Cup and the 2022–23 EFL Cup.

 First-team squad 

Statistics

Players with names in italics and marked * were on loan from another club for the whole of their season with Cardiff City.

 

|-
!colspan=15|Players out on loan:|-
!colspan=15|Players who left the club:|}

Goals record

Assists record

Disciplinary record

Clean sheetsIncludes all competitive matches. The list is sorted by squad number when total clean sheets are equal. Numbers in parentheses represent games where both goalkeepers participated and both kept a clean sheet; the number in parentheses is awarded to the goalkeeper who was substituted on, whilst a full clean sheet is awarded to the goalkeeper who was on the field at the start of play. CaptainsCorrect as of match played on 16 March 2023Contracts

 Transfers 
 In 

 Out 

 Loans in 

 Loans out 

 Pre-season and friendlies 
On 30 May, the Bluebirds announced their pre-season schedule with six matches arranged.

Competitions
Overall record

Championship

League table

Results summary

Results by round

Matches

On 23 June, the league fixtures were announced.

FA CupThe Bluebirds'' entered the competition in the third round and were drawn at home to Leeds United.

EFL Cup

Cardiff City were drawn at home to Portsmouth in the first round.

References

External links 
 

Cardiff City F.C. seasons
Cardiff City
Cardiff City
Cardiff City F.C. 2022-23
English football clubs 2022–23 season